Wolfgang Hildemann (* June 17, 1925, in Cheb/Eger; † August 25, 1995, in Düsseldorf) was a German composer and music teacher. He is known for his use of the Twelve-tone technique.

Life and education 

Hildemann was born on June 17, 1925, in the city of Cheb (formerly known as Eger or Egerland) which was part of the contentious German Sudetenland. Following World War Two, Hildemann studied at the music conservatories in Prague and Nürnberg. Among his professors were Fidelio Finke, Anton Nowakowski and Joseph Keilberth. 

Succeeding his studies in Nürnberg, Hildemann passed the examination to become a chapel master in 1952. Between 1949 and 1967, he worked as the musical instructor of the Windsbacher Knabenchor (Windsbach Boys’ Choir). From 1962 on, he taught at the Odenwaldschule in Oberhambach, a private boarding school following a concept of progressive education after World War Two.

After moving to Mönchengladbach, he continued teaching music in school at the Hugo Junkers-Gymnasium. Once settled down in Mönchengladbach, Hildemann became a professor and frequent lecture in church music and composition at the University of Applied Sciences Niederrhein (Rhineland). He further lead the musical branch at the Esslingen Künstlergilde, a group of artists. The majority of the music that ended up being published was composed during his time in Mönchengladbach.

Selected compositions

From 1975 to 1995 
 1975  Kleine Orgelmesse, 
 1976 Ritmi Dispari, Schott Musik
 1980 Diletto musicale, Breitkopf & Härtel
 1984 Et facta ora sexta, Musikverlag Christoph Dohr 
 1990 Liber organi bavarese, Musikverlag Christoph Dohr
 1990 Propriums Messe, Musikverlag Christoph Dohr
 1990 Recitativo, Aria e Toccata
 1991 Cinque Pastorelli
 1991 Concerti bavarese, Musikverlag Christoph Dohr

Posthumous 
 2003 Klassische Ohrwürmer (Classical Catchy Tunes), Edition Tonger

Style 
Hildemann worked with the Twelve-tone technique.

Awards and recognition 
 1974: Johann-Wenzel-Stamitz-Preis
 1979: Composition Prize of the City of Düsseldorf
 Also: Goldene Plakette der Stadt Mönchengladbach (Golden Badge of the City of Mönchengladbach)

References 

1925 births
1995 deaths
People from Ansbach (district)
20th-century German composers
German male composers
20th-century German male musicians